is a Japanese manga artist. Critics and scholars often count her among the Year 24 Group, a nebulous group of female artists considered to have revolutionized  manga (Japanese comics for girls) in the 1970s.

She made her professional debut in 1964 at the age of 14 with her short story , published by Shueisha in the Spring Break Special issue of Ribon. During her school breaks, Kimura continued writing short stories published in magazines such as COM and Ribon Comic. Her stories' settings throughout the 1960s and early 1970s were varied, including places like Auschwitz, Vietnam, and the slums of Rio de Janeiro. She covered topics interesting to young girls, elaborately drawing out the feelings and motivations of her characters.

The short story discussed the struggles of elementary school life. She later published , a short story about four young college girls living together.  caused her to gain wider popularity.

In recent years, Kimura has published fewer works, with most of her releases being reprints of older works. She has also created several health-related manga.

Rachel Thorn, an anthropologist noted for her work on  manga, called Kimura "one of the most brilliant and largely forgotten members of the [Year 24 Group]". Thorn praised her for creating manga with "explicitly social and feminist messages" and for addressing "issues of interest to women, including sexuality, work, and health."

Works

 (1964, Ribon, Shueisha)
 (December 1966, Ribon, Shueisha)
 (April–June 1967, Ribon, Shueisha)
 (May 1968, Ribon Comics, Shueisha)
 (March 1969, Junior Comics, Shueisha)
 (May 1969, Junior Comics, Shueisha)
 (September 1969, COM, Mushi Pro)
 (May–June 1970, COM, Mushi Pro)
 (May 1970, Ribon Comic, Shueisha)
 (September 1970, Ribon Comic, Shueisha)
 (October 1970, Ribon Comic, Shueisha)
 (February 1971, Ribon Comic, Shueisha)
 (May 1971, Ribon, Shueisha)
Collected in 
 (September 1971, COM, Mushi Pro)
 (December 1971, COM, Mushi Pro)
 (May 1973, Mushi Pro)
Collected in 
 (October 1974, Bessatsu Shōjo Comic, Shogakukan)
 (November 1974, Bessatsu Shōjo Comic, Shogakukan)
 (January 1975, Bessatsu Shōjo Comic, Shogakukan)
 (April–May 1975, Bessatsu Shōjo Comic, Shogakukan)
 (August 1975, Ribon Comic, Shueisha)
 (September 1975, Bessatsu Shōjo Comic, Shogakukan)
 (November 1975 – January 1976, Bessatsu Shōjo Comic, Shogakukan)
 (Spring 1976, Ribon Deluxe, Shueisha)
 (November 1976, Bessatsu Shōjo Comic, Shogakukan)
 (March 1977, Bessatsu Shōjo Comic, Shogakukan)
40-0 (March 1977, Mimi, Kodansha)
 (1 May 1977, Big Comic Original, Shogakukan)
 (September 1977, Mimi, Kodansha)
 (October 1977, Bessatsu Shōjo Comic, Shogakukan)
 (April, June 1978, Mimi, Kodansha)
 (May–June, September 1978, Princess, Akita Shoten)
 (December 1978, Bessatsu Shōjo Comic, Shogakukan)
Flight (April 1979, Seventeen, Shueisha)
 (December 1979 – February 1980, Asahi Sonorama)
 (February 1980, Seventeen, Shueisha)
 (June, August, November 1980 and January, March 1981, Mimi, Kodansha)
 (August 1980, Petit Comic, Shogakukan)
 (Summer 1980, Petit Flower, Shogakukan)
Revised version published in the 1 July 1981 issue of 
 (January–March 1981, Petit Comic, Shogakukan)
 (August, December 1981, February 1982)
 (Early Spring Special 1982, Akita Shoten)
 (January–June 1984, Bonita Eve, Akita Shoten)
 (February 1987, Akita Shoten)
 (October 1989, Comic Burger)
Later reprinted as 
 (October 1990 – August 1992, Human Sexuality)
 (December 1992, Rosa, Shōnen Gahōsha)
And I Love Her (June 1993, Rosa, Shōnen Gahōsha)
 (March 1993, Rosa, Shōnen Gahōsha)
 (September 1993, Belle Rose, Shōnen Gahōsha)
 (December 1993, January–February 1994, Belle Rose, Shōnen Gahōsha)
Later reprinted as 
The Rose (March 1994, Belle Rose, Shōnen Gahōsha)
You've Got a Friend (June 1994, Belle Rose, Shōnen Gahōsha)
 (September 1994, Belle Rose, Shōnen Gahōsha)
 (August 1995, Belle Rose, Shōnen Gahōsha)
 (May 2000, Tokyo Women's Foundation)
 (2006, Asahi Sonorama)
 (2007, Mugenkan, Asahi Sonorama)
Remake of her 1976 short story of the same name

References

External links
 Minori Kimura at the Media Arts Database 
 Manga reviews at  

1949 births
Female comics writers
Japanese female comics artists
Living people
Manga artists from Saitama Prefecture
Women manga artists